Northern Territory Greens is a Green Party located in the Northern Territory, a member of the federation of the Australian Greens party.

Green candidates first ran in the Northern Territory at the 1990 federal election and the 1990 Northern Territory election. The 1996 federal election saw the first NT Greens candidates contest a federal election under an official party banner.

The NT Greens saw its first electoral victory in April 2008, when candidate Greg Jarvis was elected as one of three members for Darwin City Council's Chan Ward, defeating incumbent alderman Christine Tilley. Jarvis died on the First of February 2010 and the resultant by-election was won by Greens candidate Robin Knox. In the 2012 local government elections the party's representation on Council was doubled in Darwin with the re-election of Robin Knox in Chan Ward and election of Simon Niblock in Lyons Ward. In Alice Springs, Jade Kudrenko was the first Green Councillor, elected in 2012.

At the 2008 Northern Territory election, the Greens ran in six of the 25 seats in the unicameral parliament, averaging around 16 percent. The highest vote was in Nightcliff at 23.7 percent. The NT Greens increased their vote in both Houses to a record 13 percent at the 2010 federal election.

At the 2020 Northern Territory election, the party once again contested ten of the twenty-five Assembly seats and achieved a record result with 4.46% of the primary vote. They were closest to a place in a two-party preferred contest in Nightcliff, where candidate Billee McGinley was within 14 votes of beating the Country Liberal Party into second place at the final exclusion.

At the 2021 local government elections, the party endorsed candidates in the elections for Alice Springs Town Council, Barkly Regional Council, and City of Darwin. The Greens candidates in Darwin and the Barkly were successful.

Election results

Local Government
The NT Greens currently have two members elected to local government in the Northern Territory: Morgan Rickard, Alderman for Chan Ward in City of Darwin, and Dianne Stokes, elected in Patta Ward, Barkly Regional Council. Dianne Stokes is currently the Deputy Mayor of Barkly Regional Council. 

The NT Greens have previously had three Aldermen on City of Darwin: Greg Jarvis (2008-10), Robin Knox (2010-21), and Simon Niblock (2012-21). The NT Greens also elected an Councillor, Jade Kudrenko, to Alice Springs Town Council in 2012.

Northern Territory Legislative Assembly

Federal Elections

References

Australian Greens by state
Political parties in the Northern Territory